Hugo Clere (born 11 June 1994) is a French motorcycle racer. He has competed in the European Superstock 600 Championship and French Supersport Championship, where he was champion in 2016. In 2022 FIM Endurance World Championship he rides for Team 18 Sapeurs Pompiers in superstock category.

Career statistics

Grand Prix motorcycle racing

By season

Races by year

References

External links

Living people
French motorcycle racers
Moto2 World Championship riders
1994 births
Sportspeople from Bourg-en-Bresse